Malcolm von Schantz FLS (born May 1966) is a professor of chronobiology at the University of Surrey. His research relates to circadian rhythms and sleep in human beings and its molecular determinants. He is a Special Visiting Scientist at the University of São Paulo School of Medicine and a fellow of the Linnean Society. He is part of the international team that determined that urbanisation and electricity are not to blame for sleep loss.

Selected publications
From Genes to Genomes: Concepts and Applications of DNA Technology. Wiley-Blackwell, 2007. (With Jeremy W. Dale)

References

External links 
Researchgate profile

Living people
Academics of the University of Surrey
Fellows of the Linnean Society of London
1966 births
Swedish scientists
Lund University alumni
Sleep researchers